Euphemia Cowan Barnett (1890–1970) was a Scottish botanist known for her research of the flora of Thailand, particularly Fagaceae.

Biography 
Barnett was educated at the High School for Girls in Aberdeen, she then went on to study botany at the University of Aberdeen graduating with a BSc in 1918. After graduation she worked as an assistant to Professors J. W. H. Trail and W. G. Craib at the University and studied the botanical specimens that Crab and Dr A.F.G. Bell had collected in Thailand. When she returned to Aberdeen later in her career she continued her research into this collection an earned a DSc for her work in 1940.

Barnett was a lecturer in mycology and plant pathology at the West of Scotland College of Agriculture, then lecturer in biology at Robert Gordon's Technical College, and finally Head of Biology Department at Aberdeen College of Education where she remained until her retirement in 1955.

After she retired she received a Research Fellowship from the University of Aberdeen, and continued her research of Thai flora at both the University's herbarium and the Royal Botanic Garden, Kew, London.

She identified and named many Thai plants. The genus Barnettia (Bignoniaceae) was named by Dr Santisuk in her honour.

Outside academia she was associated with the Girl Guides since they had been established in the city.

She died at her home in Aberdeen on 12 March 1970.

Works

References 

1890 births
1970 deaths
Scottish women scientists
Scottish botanists
Scottish women academics
Scottish biologists
20th-century Scottish scientists
20th-century biologists
20th-century Scottish women